The Akaflieg Darmstadt D-39 was a single-seat motor glider derived from the D-38 sailplane. Built in Germany in the late 1970s, it was not intended for production and only one was constructed.

Design and development
The D-39 was a motorised version of the D-38 sailplane, with wings moved down from the latter's shoulder-wing position to the bottom of the fuselage. A Limbach SL 1700 flat four engine was conventionally mounted in the nose; the propeller could be removed but not folded away in flight.  The wings, with 4° of dihedral, tail and monocoque fuselage were formed from glass fibre balsa sandwiches and the ailerons from glass fibre/Klégécel foam sandwiches. The D-38 had an all moving T-tailplane, fitted with a Flettner tab.  It landed on a retractable monowheel, fitted with a drum brake and assisted by a small, fixed tailwheel.

The D-39 was first flown on 28 June 1979.  By July 1982 it had been modified into the D-39b, with a greater span, revised wing roots and fitted with a three-bladed Hoffmann Propeller airscrew with three blades and three pitch positions. The D-39 was not further developed nor put into production.

Variants
D-39 Original version
D-39b Same aircraft modified with greater span, revised roots and a new propeller.

Specifications (D-39)

References

Motor gliders
1970s German sailplanes
Akaflieg Darmstadt aircraft
Single-engined tractor aircraft
Low-wing aircraft
Aircraft first flown in 1979